The Coupe de France Final 1939 was a football match held at Stade Olympique Yves-du-Manoir, Colombes on May 14, 1939, that saw RC Paris defeat Olympique Lillois 3–1 thanks to goals by José Pérez, Emile Veinante and Jules Mathé.

Match details

See also
Coupe de France 1938-1939

External links
Coupe de France results at Rec.Sport.Soccer Statistics Foundation
Report on French federation site (archived from the original on 5 September 2012)

Coupe
1939
Coupe De France Final 1939
Coupe De France Final 1939
Sport in Hauts-de-Seine
Coupe de France Final
Coupe de France Final